Creation/Creator is an oratorio for soprano, mezzo-soprano, tenor, baritone, bass, chorus, and orchestra by the American composer Christopher Theofanidis.  The work was commissioned by the Atlanta Symphony Orchestra and was first performed on April 23, 2015 by the soprano Jessica Rivera, mezzo-soprano Kelley O'Connor, tenor Thomas Cooley, baritone Nmon Ford, bass Evan Boyer, the actors Steven Cole and Shannon Eubanks, and the Atlanta Symphony Chorus and Orchestra under the conductor Robert Spano.

Composition
Creation/Creator has a duration of 81 minutes and is composed in 15 movements:
Elephant in the Dark
God-Tapestry
Pan Gu and the Egg-Shaped Cloud
An Unknown Woman
Poets of Science
Laboratories of the Universe
In the Eternal
This Dream, Strange and Moving
Two Girls
Ms. Margaret Cavendish
Between Green Thread and Broccoli
The Creation
An Angel in the Marble
The Music it Makes
All Things Bound in a Single Book

The music combines elements rock and roll, world music, and classical music.  The text of the piece is drawn from various sources, including the legend of Pangu from Chinese mythology and the works of the American author James Weldon Johnson.

Instrumentation
The work calls for soprano, mezzo-soprano, tenor, baritone, bass solos, actor, actress, mixed choir, and an orchestra of two flutes (second doubling piccolo), two oboes (second doubling cor anglais), three clarinets (second doubling alto saxophone, third doubling bass clarinet), two bassoons (second doubling contrabassoon), four horns, three trumpets, three trombones, tuba, harp, electric guitar, electric bass, synthesizer, timpani, percussion, and strings.

Reception
Reviewing the world premiere performance, Mark Gresham of ArtsATL highly praised the piece, writing, "Theofanidis may well have himself a landmark work in Creation/Creator.  It is only superficially akin to Haydn's Creation in theme as an oratorio. While Haydn's work dealt with human creativity only as a subtext to the Biblical creation story, it is central to Theofanidis' oratorio. If considered only from a point of the composer's choices of texts alone, it is a work that will spark the interest of contemporary audiences."

References

Compositions by Christopher Theofanidis
2015 compositions
Oratorios
Music commissioned by the Atlanta Symphony Orchestra